Lilliane Catherine Diomi (born June 1, 2001), known professionally as ppcocaine (previously known as trapbunniebubbles), is an American social media personality and rapper. She is best known for her song "3 Musketeers" that gained popularity on the video-sharing platform TikTok.

Early life
Diomi was born in 2001 in the Panorama City neighborhood of Los Angeles and raised in the Santa Clarita area. She is biracial and was born to a Congolese father and a white mother. Raised primarily by her grandparents and father, she attended Canyon High School, Birmingham High School and Golden Valley High School, graduating from the latter. While in high school, she was enrolled in dance classes and worked as an erotic dancer when she was older.

Career
In her early career, ppcocaine went by the pseudonym trapbunniebubbles.

A snippet of her song "PJ" was posted to her account on the video-sharing platform TikTok in June 2020 and subsequently went viral on the platform. Her debut single, "DDLG", was released in the same month and also gained attention on TikTok. A snippet from an unreleased song, "For That Cash", was posted on her TikTok in July 2020 and was heralded as a "lesbian anthem" on the platform. She released her single "3 Musketeers" featuring fellow rapper NextYoungin in July 2020. The song also gained traction on TikTok. It became her first single to chart in the US and elsewhere, peaking at number 22 on the Billboard Bubbling Under Hot 100 chart and at number 76 on the Irish Singles Chart in August 2020. She later released "PJ" in August 2020. She appeared in the top 10 on Rolling Stone'''s August 2020 Breakthrough 25 chart of the fastest-rising new artists of the month, and in the same month, signed with Columbia Records. In September 2020, she released a music video for "3 Musketeers". , she has over one million followers on TikTok.

Public image
Jessica Wang of Bustle said ppcocaine is best known for "aggressive vocal deliveries". According to Zoe Haylock of Vulture, she has a "nasally cartoon-character voice". Jon Caramanica of New York Times said her music has a "rascally joy and bad-kid energy", calling it "playfully lewd" and noting that it has become "TikTok grammar" since its release. Time called her vocals "energetic, if chipmunk-esque". In 2020, her song "3 Musketeers" was described by Caramanica as "one of the definitive songs of this summer" and "something of a lesbian anthem on TikTok". Wang called her song "PJ" "an anthem for women psyching each other up" and called her unreleased song "For That Cash" "a lesbian anthem". She gained popularity on both "alt" TikTok and "straight" TikTok. The Los Angeles Times called her songs "so over-the-top sexual that they make 'WAP' read like The Notebook."Vulture compared her favorably to rappers Megan Thee Stallion, Flo Milli, and Rico Nasty. According to Wang, ppcocaine's songs became popular on TikTok due to dance videos made during the COVID-19 pandemic. The publication called her "the TikTok star behind, among other trends, the viral 'Shake Some Ass' dance trend".

Artistry
Diomi has cited American rappers Rico Nasty, Stunna Girl, Bali Baby, and Flo Milli as influences on her music, the former of which featured Diomi in the official remix of the song "Smack a Bitch" on her 2020 album Nightmare Vacation.'' Diomi is also known for her trademark color pink, usually wearing pink clothes and or bubblegum pink hair.

Personal life
Diomi previously identified as a lesbian, but came out as bisexual in March 2022 and is genderfluid.

Discography

Singles

As lead artist

As featured artist

Guest appearances

Music videos

Notes

References

External links 
 
 

21st-century American rappers
American hip hop musicians
American hip hop singers
American TikTokers
American LGBT singers
LGBT African Americans
Musicians from Santa Monica, California
People from Panorama City, Los Angeles
People from Santa Clarita, California
Rappers from California
Living people
2001 births
LGBT rappers
Non-binary musicians
African-American rappers
21st-century African-American singers
American people of Democratic Republic of the Congo descent
21st-century LGBT people
LGBT people from California
21st-century women rappers
Genderfluid people